The 2015–16 AS Saint-Étienne season was the 83rd professional season of the club since its creation in 1933.

Players

French teams are limited to four players without EU citizenship. Hence, the squad list includes only the principal nationality of each player; several non-European players on the squad have dual citizenship with an EU country. Also, players from the ACP countries—countries in Africa, the Caribbean, and the Pacific that are signatories to the Cotonou Agreement—are not counted against non-EU quotas due to the Kolpak ruling.

Current squad 
As of 1 February 2016.

Out on loan

Transfer

Transfers in

Loans in

Transfers out

Loans out

Competitions

Ligue 1

League table

Results summary

Results by round

Matches

Coupe de la Ligue

Coupe de France

UEFA Europa League

Third Qualifying Round

Play-off Round

Group stage

Knockout phase

Round of 32

Statistics

Appearances and Goals

|-
|colspan="14"|Players away from the club on loan:

|-
|colspan="14"|Players who appeared for Saint-Étienne no longer at the club:

|}

Goalscorers

Disciplinary record

References

Saint-Etienne
Saint-Étienne
AS Saint-Étienne seasons